The Donnell Fire was a wildfire that started on August 1, 2018 due to an unattended illegal campfire, near Donnell Reservoir, burning around California State Route 108 in Tuolumne County, California and in the Stanislaus National Forest. It spread rapidly, and the Forest Service closed a California state highway, many forest service roads, campgrounds, wilderness areas, access to privately-owned inholdings, and the Pacific Crest Trail. The fire burned , and destroyed 54 major structures and 81 minor structures, before the fire burned out on October 1. There were nine injuries caused by the fire, but no deaths.

Among the destroyed buildings were those of the historic Dardanelle Resort and the 1933 Dardanelle Bridge a unique bridge listed on the Historic American Engineering Record. Both were at Dardanelle, an unincorporated community on California State Route 108, the highway to Sonora Pass.  

The ancient Bennett Juniper was threatened by the fire, which came within half a mile, but the fire front stabilized after sustained ground and air attacks, and by the evening of August 14, it was no longer advancing toward the tree.

On October 1, 2018, InciWeb reported minimal fire activity.  The fire was declared 100% contained on November 28, 2018.

See also
2018 California wildfires

References

External links
Video of 747 Supertanker dropping fire retardant on southern perimeter of Donnell fire on August 12, 2018.  Facebook.  US Forest Service-Stanislaus National Forest, August 13, 2018.

2018 California wildfires
Wildfires in Alpine County, California